Jeff Ross Presents Roast Battle is an American roast comedy competition television series that is broadcast on Comedy Central.

The show is hosted by Jeff Ross and consists of one on one roast battles during which the comedians insult each other comedically. The winners of each battle are decided by a panel of guest judges that consists of fellow comedians and other celebrities. Comedian Brian Moses serves as the announcer and referee for each battle.

History
The television series is based on a live show that runs at The Comedy Store in Los Angeles in the comedy club's Belly Room. The live show originated from a heated argument that occurred in The Comedy Store's parking lot in 2013 between two comedians over a stolen joke. The argument was about to devolve into a physical fight and comedian Brian Moses–who was hosting an open mic night the following night–suggested that the two comedians could fight it out verbally on stage. Two other comedians volunteered to judge the event. From there Moses and fellow comedian Rell Battle started the live Roast Battle comedy show.

Moses and Battle eventually parted ways. Moses continued the show in the Belly Room and his shows were sometimes credited as "Jeffrey Ross Presents". Moses also brought the show to The Stand comedy club in New York City under the title Brian Moses and Jeff Ross Present Roastmasters. Both the LA and NYC roast battle shows held bracket-style tournaments to determine the top regional roaster for each city, then the top LA and NYC roasters would compete for the title of Roastmaster, which included a championship belt similar to those awarded in professional combat sports.

The Roastmasters show in NYC was emceed by comedian Luis J. Gomez and audio recordings were posted to a podcast feed under the Roastmasters name. The NYC show dissolved in 2018. Moses also broadcast audio recordings of the LA show as a podcast titled Verbal Violence. The show gained in popularity and Ross was able to recruit friends like Dave Chappelle and Sarah Silverman to serve as guest judges during the show.

Since 2014 Ross has been adviser and lead judge of Roast Battle In 2015 Ross brought the live show to the Just For Laughs comedy festival in Montreal where it caught the attention of Jonas Larsen, a senior vice president at Comedy Central. The first episode of Jeff Ross Presents Roast Battle aired on the network in 2016. In 2018 the Verbal Violence podcast's name was changed to Roast Battle and the podcast was moved to Comedy Central’s Global Podcast Network.

Format
The show is hosted by Jeff Ross who also serves as one of the judges on each show.  Comedian and show co-creator Brian Moses announces each competitor and also serves as referee. The winners of each battle are determined by a panel of guest judges that include two or more comedians or other celebrities.  There are three rules to the competition: The competitors must use only original material, no physical contact is allowed and the battle always ends with a hug.

In the first two season there were regional events filmed at various comedy clubs across the United States in search of some or all of the sixteen contestants to compete in the main eight battle competition via a bracket-style tournament.  In the first season the regionals were held in Los Angeles, Austin, Chicago and New York City. The final eight battles were filmed at the 2016 Just for Laughs festival in Montreal and the very final battle was broadcast live on Comedy Central.

In the second season the regionals were held at the Comedy Cellar in New York City, Comedy Works in Denver, Colorado, the Laughing Skull Lounge in Atlanta, Georgia and the Los Angeles Comedy Store. In addition, there were comedians added to the final sixteen competitors list who did not compete in the regionals. The final eight battles of the second season were filmed on the Sunset Strip and the final battle was also broadcast live.

The show changed it format in the third season and abandoned the bracket-style tournament. As a result there were no preliminary regional battles and instead each episode featured only two battles per episode over six episodes. In addition Anthony Jeselnik and Nikki Glaser served as judges on all six episodes and they were also joined by Pete Davidson during the final episode. The final episode also marked the first time that Ross took to the stage as a battler during the show; he battled with NBA player Blake Griffin.

International versions
The popularity of Jeff Ross Presents Roast Battle has led to the launch of roast battle shows on some of Comedy Central's sister stations outside of the United States:
 Comedy Central’s Roast Battle South Africa launched in 2017 on Comedy Central Africa and was renewed for a second season in 2018.
 Roast Battle was launched in 2018 on Comedy Central (UK & Ireland).  The show is hosted by former Jeff Ross Presents Roast Battle contestant Jimmy Carr.
 Duelo des Comediantes was launched on Comedy Central Latinoamérica in 2018.
 Two versions have been produced in Canada, the English-language Roast Battle Canada for CTV Comedy Channel and the French-language Roast Battle: Le Grand Duel for Z.

Broadcasts

Episodes

Series 1
The winner of each roast battle is in bold.

Series 2
The winner of each roast battle is in bold.

Series 3

References

2010s American comedy game shows
2016 American television series debuts
Comedy Central game shows
English-language television shows
Roast (comedy)